Charles Arthur Sanderson (9 December 1903 – 1976) was an English footballer who played in the Football League for Barnsley.

References

1903 births
1976 deaths
English footballers
Association football midfielders
English Football League players
Wombwell F.C. players
Barnsley F.C. players
Mexborough Athletic F.C. players